The 38th Vuelta a España (Tour of Spain), a long-distance bicycle stage race and one of the three grand tours, was held from 19 April to 8 May 1983.
The foreign favourites for the race included Bernard Hinault who had won the Vuelta once before in 1978 and World Champion Giuseppe Saronni. The Spanish favourites for the race included the de facto defending champion Marino Lejarreta, Julián Gorospe and Alberto Fernández.

Hinault took the leadership of the race after the fifth stage only to lose it the following day to Lejarreta. Lejarreta then won the stage 8  mountain time trial and increased his lead over Hinault. On the stage from Zaragoza to Soria that was won by Saronni, Lejarreta had a fall and lost the jersey to Gorospe. Fernández took the leadership the following day. Lejarreta came back and won the stage 13 to Lagos de Covadonga. However Fernández kept the leader's jersey. On the following stage Álvaro Pino took the jersey and wore it for two days. Hinault won the individual time trial but did not win by enough time to take the jersey which passed again to Gorospe. Two days later Hinault's pace on the climb to Puerto de Serranillos was too hot for his opponents and he won the stage in Ávila and took back the leader's jersey to win his second Vuelta and his eighth grand tour with Lejarreta second and Fernández in third. The great battle waged between Hinault and the Spanish riders has led to the 1983 race being described as its most spectacular edition. In addition to this the start list for the 1983 Renault team at the Vuelta included Hinault, Greg LeMond and Laurent Fignon, the only time they rode on the same team in a Grand Tour.

This victory proved costly for Hinault however, as due to a recurrent tendinitis issue that had developed in his knee, which he greatly aggravated on the climb to Puerto de Serranillos, Hinault was unable to ride in that year's Tour, where Fignon took over Team Renault.

Teams and riders

Route

Results

Final General Classification

References

 
1983 in road cycling
1983
1983 in Spanish sport
April 1983 sports events in Europe
May 1983 sports events in Europe
1983 Super Prestige Pernod